Matthew Bowden (1779–1814) served as surgeon in the Royal Lancashire Regiment and assistant surgeon on David Collins' 1803 expedition to found a British settlement in Port Phillip, now part of Victoria, Australia.
The settlement (and Bowden) relocated to Hobart, Tasmania in early 1804.

He died in Tasmania on 23 October 1814.

See also
 Ocean (1794 ship), the merchant ship that carried Bowden to Port Philip
 History of Victoria, for the 1803 British settlement of Port Phillip

References

1779 births
1814 deaths
History of Tasmania
History of Victoria (Australia)